Neil Richard Ardley (26 May 1937 – 23 February 2004) was a prominent English jazz pianist and composer, who also made his name as the author of more than 100 popular books on science and technology, and on music.

Early years
Neil Ardley was born in Wallington, Surrey. He attended Wallington County Grammar School and at the age of thirteen started to learn the piano and later the saxophone. He read Chemistry at Bristol University, where he also played both piano and saxophone in jazz groups, and from which he graduated in 1959 with a BSc.

Career

Music
Ardley moved to London and studied arranging and composing with Ray Premru and Bill Russo from 1960 to 1961. He joined the John Williams Big Band as pianist, writing both arrangements and new compositions, and from 1964 to 1970 was the director of the newly formed New Jazz Orchestra, which employed some of the best young musicians in London, including Ian Carr, Jon Hiseman, Barbara Thompson, Dave Gelly, Mike Gibbs, Don Rendell, and Trevor Tomkins.

In the late 1960s, encouraged by record producer and impresario Denis Preston, Ardley began composing in earnest, combining classical and jazz methods. His rich orchestrations were augmented in the 1970s by the addition of synthesisers. His contemporary jazz album Kaleidoscope Of Rainbows was number 22 in the New Musical Express top 24 albums of 1976. However, as he began work on an all-electronic album in 1980, Ardley's recording contract was suddenly terminated, and he fell back on his writing and publishing career. He continued to play and compose, especially with Zyklus, the electronic jazz group he formed with composer (and former student) John L. Walters, Derbyshire musician Warren Greveson and Ian Carr.

Singing in local choirs in the later 1990s led Ardley to start composing choral music, and this occupied most of his musical attention until his death. At the time of his death, Ardley had begun to gig and record again with a slimmed down Zyklus consisting of himself, Warren Greaveson, and Nick Robinson.

Writing
Ardley joined the editorial staff of the World Book Encyclopedia in 1962, when the London branch of the American publisher was producing an international edition. This took four years, during which time he developed the skill of editing and writing introductory material for the young. After a brief period working for Hamlyn, he became a freelance editor in 1968 (which enabled him to continue with his musical career). In the 1970s, he moved into writing introductory books, mostly for children, on natural history (especially birds), science and technology, and music, such as What Is It?.

Just as his composing and performance had been moved forward by the introduction and development of technology, so too with his publishing career, as computers began to become more and more important. In 1984 Ardley began to write mainly for Dorling Kindersley, producing a series of books which included the best-selling (over three million copies worldwide) and award-winning The Way Things Work, illustrated by David Macaulay.

When he retired in 2000 Ardley had written 101 books, with total sales of about ten million.

Personal life
In 1960, Ardley married Bridget Gantley, and the couple had one daughter. In 2003 he married Vivian Wilson. He died in Milford, Derbyshire.

Works
Selected choral compositions include:

Creation Mass (2001), a setting of 11 poems by long-term collaborator Patrick Huddie
Cantabile (2003), commissioned by Bakewell Choral Society to mark its 25th anniversary

Discography
1965: Western Reunion (New Jazz Orchestra)
1968: Le Déjeuner sur l'Herbe (New Jazz Orchestra)
1970: Greek Variations (with Ian Carr & Don Rendell)
1971: A Symphony of Amaranths
1973: Mike Taylor Remembered (with Jon Hiseman, Barbara Thompson, Ian Carr, Henry Lowther, Dave Gelly, and Norma Winstone)
1976: Kaleidoscope of Rainbows (with Ian Carr and Nucleus, produced by Paul Buckmaster)
1978: Harmony of the Spheres (with Ian Carr, Tony Coe, Barbara Thompson, Norma Winstone, Pepi Lemer, Trevor Tomkins, Geoff Castle, Bill Christian, Richard Burgess and John Martyn)
1991: Virtual Realities (Zyklus) (with Ian Carr, John L. Walters and Warren Greveson)
2001: Creation Mass (words by Patrick Huddie)
2021: Kaleidoscope of Rainbows Live at the Queen Elizabeth Hall 1975 (with Nucleus, Brian Smith, Tony Coe, Dave Macrae, Trevor Tomkins, Barbara Thompson and Paul Buckmaster)

References

Sources and external links
Carr, Ian, Digby Fairweather, & Brian Priestley. Jazz: The Rough Guide. London: Rough Guides. 
Ardley, Neil, David Lambert and Mark Lambert. What Is It? Question and Answer Encyclopedia. London: Kingfisher Books. 
Neil Ardley Official Website – includes lists of his books and compositions.
[ Neil Ardley] – biographical sketch by Eugene Chadbourne for Allmusic.
 Playing the Band: The musical life of Jon Hiseman, by Martyn Hanson. Edited by Colin Richardson. 

 Alyn Shipton, Out of the Long Dark: The Life of Ian Carr, Equinox Publishing, 2006. ISBN (paperback) 1845532228; ISBN (paperback) 9781845532222
 John L. Walters, "Neil Ardley" (obituary), The Guardian, Thursday 4 March 2004.

1937 births
2004 deaths
People from Wallington, London
Alumni of the University of Bristol
English jazz composers
Male jazz composers
English male composers
English jazz pianists
English science writers
20th-century British pianists
20th-century English composers
Nucleus (band) members
People educated at Wallington County Grammar School
British male pianists
20th-century British male musicians
20th-century British musicians
New Jazz Orchestra members
20th-century jazz composers